Hecajapyx is a genus of diplurans in the family Japygidae.

Species
 Hecajapyx bucketti Smith, 1964
 Hecajapyx vulgaris Smith, 1959

References

Diplura